Squalius vardarensis is a species of ray-finned fish in the family Cyprinidae. It is found in the Sperchios to Vardar drainages in Greece and Macedonia.

References

Squalius
Fish described in 1928
Taxa named by Stanko Karaman